Roath railway station was a short-lived railway station in Cardiff. It opened in 1899 and closed in 1917. The station was on the South Wales Main Line.

Despite its name, Roath was actually located in the Splott area of the city.

Description
Roath was a substantial station, having two platforms, each covered by a large wooden awning. During the First World War, the station was used as a reception centre for wounded troops, who were taken to the nearby Splotlands Board School, which was then in use as a hospital.

Closure
After the station closed on 2 April 1917, the buildings fell into disrepair and became heavily vandalised. The building which fronted the street was later used by the Splott & District Amateur Operatic Society, who used it as a workshop for building scenery and props. The building was later demolished altogether. The site is now occupied by an extension of the Old Illtydians RFC. Trains still pass the site of the old station, but there is no longer any station in the area.

References

Disused railway stations in Cardiff
Former Great Western Railway stations
Railway stations in Great Britain opened in 1899
Railway stations in Great Britain closed in 1917
1899 establishments in Wales
1917 disestablishments in Wales